There is a relatively low prevalence of HIV/AIDS in New Zealand, with an estimated 2,900 people out a population of 4.51 million living with HIV/AIDS as of 2014. The rate of newly diagnosed HIV infections was stable at around 100 annually through the late 1980s and the 1990s but rose sharply from 2000 to 2005. It has since stabilised at roughly 200 new cases annually. Male-to-male sexual contact has been the largest contributor to new HIV cases in New Zealand since record began in 1985. Heterosexual contact is the second largest contributor to new cases, but unlike male-to-male contact, they are mostly acquired outside New Zealand. In 2018 the New Zealand Government reported a “major reduction” in the number of people diagnosed with HIV.

The first recorded death in New Zealand from AIDS-related conditions was in New Plymouth in April 1984.

In 1985 Eve van Grafhorst was ostracised in Australia since she had contracted HIV/AIDS caused by a transfusion of infected blood. The family moved to New Zealand where she died at the age of 11. By the time of her death, her plight had significantly raised the level of AIDS awareness in New Zealand.

World AIDS Day is observed in New Zealand.

Organisations
The Ministry of Health is the government department which deals with health issues, including HIV/AIDS.

The New Zealand AIDS Foundation is a registered charitable trust which focuses on prevention of AIDS in the most at-risk group, namely men who have sex with men.

Other organisations that assist with people living with HIV are as follows:

Body Positive provides rapid HIV tests and support for people who are positive.

Positive Women. This service looks after women who are HIV positive. 

There are many other places that offer similar services including the Burnett Center, INA Foundation, New Zealand Prostitutes Collective, Family Planning and Sexual Health Clinics.

Antiretroviral medications
The Pharmaceutical Management Agency (Pharmac) manages the national schedule of subsidised medications. As of 2014, twenty-one different antiretroviral medications were subsidised for people with confirmed HIV/AIDS or for post-exposure prophylaxis.

In March 2018, New Zealand became one of the first countries in the world to publicly fund pre-exposure prophylaxis medication for those at a high risk of contracting HIV.

See also
AIDS pandemic

References

External links
HIV and AIDS Information, Ministry of Health